Mariusz Zasada (born 19 January 1951) is a Polish gymnast. He competed in eight events at the 1976 Summer Olympics.

References

1951 births
Living people
Polish male artistic gymnasts
Olympic gymnasts of Poland
Gymnasts at the 1976 Summer Olympics
Sportspeople from Bydgoszcz